Red's Good Groove is an album by American jazz pianist Red Garland with a quintet which was recorded in 1962 and released on the Jazzland label.

Reception

The AllMusic reviewer Ken Dryden stated: "Although this is a one time studio blowing session, things obviously gelled quickly for everyone as they got underway on this 1962 recording... [a] very enjoyable session".

Track listing
 "Red's Good Groove" (Red Garland) – 8:22  
 "Love Is Here to Stay" (George Gershwin, Ira Gershwin) – 4:44  
 "This Time the Dream's on Me" (Harold Arlen, Johnny Mercer) – 5:54
 "Take Me in Your Arms" (Dana Suesse, Pierre Norman) – 5:35    
 "Excerent!" (Pepper Adams) – 6:05  
 "Falling in Love with Love" (Lorenz Hart, Richard Rodgers) – 6:06

Personnel
Red Garland – piano
Blue Mitchell – trumpet
Pepper Adams – baritone saxophone
Sam Jones – bass
Philly Joe Jones – drums

References 

1962 albums
Red Garland albums
Jazzland Records (1960) albums